Yavaros is a fishing ports of Sonora state in Mexico and is one of six ports within the state. The population of Yavaros is 4,058. It is located within Huatabampo Municipality.

References

Populated places in Sonora